Bruce Wilson Sumner  (July 1, 1924 – March 25, 2018) served in the United States Marine Corps during World War II and the Korean War.

After leaving the bench in 1985 Judge Sumner was involved in private judging and was appointed the Trustee for a failing bank's trust department. He subsequently appointed Mosier & Company as the administrator to recover $10 million for 64 pension plans belonging to 32 doctors. The effort was called the 1985 Sumner Trust.

Judge Sumner served as a United States Marine and at the very end of World War II and later served in the Korean conflict where he received six Battle Stars, three Presidential Unit Citations and a Letter of Commendation with the Combat Letter “V.” He retired from the Marine reserve as a Lt. Colonel and continues to serve on the Board of Directors of the November 10th Association. As a lawyer he was a Deputy Public Defender, and later a partner at Kindel & Anderson. Judge Sumner also put in three impressive terms in the California State Legislature as an Assemblyman where he served as Chair of the Judiciary Committee. As an Assemblyman, he carried the enabling legislation for projects such as Dana Point Harbor, the University of California at Irvine and California State University at Fullerton – all milestones in the development of Orange County that make a material contribution to the quality and substance of today's unique and enviable quality of life.

As a distinguished member of the judiciary, Judge Sumner served as the Presiding Judge ("PJ") for the Orange County Superior Court. He also served as PJ in the Probate and Juvenile departments. He was a faculty member at the Judges' College, and a frequent lecturer on trial tactics. He was selected as Judge of the Year by the Trial Lawyers' Association. Perhaps his highest honor as a judge was having received the Franklin G. West award – the
top award for Orange County's most outstanding jurist.
As a Statesman He headed the Constitutional Revision Commission that redrafted the entire California State Constitution. Judge Sumner was also active in Human Rights as a member of Amnesty International where he presided over alleged human rights violations in Chile and Rhodesia. He also edited the Courts Martial procedures for the military justice system for the US Defense Department as special counsel for Secretary of Defense Caspar Weinberger. A lifelong swimmer, Judge Sumner has won 5 gold medals in the Senior Olympics. As an expression of his enthusiasm for swimming, he served as Chair of the swimming division of the Modern Pentathlon during the 1984 Olympics in Los Angeles.

Sumner served three terms in the California State Assembly representing District 74 where he served as Chair of the Judiciary Committee. He was a key player in enabling legislation for such projects as Dana Point Harbor, the University of California at Irvine and at Fullerton.  He was later a Superior Court Judge.

References

United States Marine Corps personnel of World War II
1924 births
2018 deaths
United States Marine Corps personnel of the Korean War
Republican Party members of the California State Assembly
20th-century American politicians